The following lists events in the year 2017 in Romania.

Incumbents
 President: Klaus Iohannis
 Prime Minister: Dacian Cioloș (until January 4), Sorin Grindeanu (until June 21), Mihai Tudose

Events

January
 January 4 – Sorin Grindeanu takes over as Prime Minister of Romania.
 January 24 – President Klaus Iohannis initiates proceedings for a national referendum on continuing the fight against corruption in Romania.
 January 29 – Over 90,000 people march in protests against the government's proposal to pardon thousands of prisoners.
 January 31 – Despite protests, the government adopts an emergency ordinance to decriminalize some offenses.

February
 February 4 – Prime Minister Grindeanu announces plans to scrap the proposed decree decriminalizing graft offenses.
 February 5 – Tens of thousands march against a government's plan to decriminalize certain corruption offenses.
 February 8 – 2017 Romanian protests
 The government fails to secure a minister who is investigated for corruption.
 President Iohannis's appeal against the emergency ordinance to decriminalize corruption offenses was rejected by the Constitutional Court.
 February 9 – After losing support of Prime Minister Grindeanu, Florin Iordache resigns from Justice Minister. The same day, the President of the Senate notifies the Constitutional Court on a judicial conflict between the government and the National Anticorruption Directorate.

June
 June 16 – Ludovic Orban is elected President of the National Liberal Party, the largest opposition party in the country.
 June 21 – The Parliament dismisses Prime Minister Sorin Grindeanu after his Social Democratic Party submits a no-confidence vote.
 June 26 – President Iohannis appoints former Minister of Economy Mihai Tudose as new Prime Minister of Romania.

August
 August 24 – Newly elected President of France Emmanuel Macron visits Romania for the first time.

September
 September 17 – A violent storm in western Romania leaves eight people dead and 137 injured. 
 September 30 – One person dies and 19 people are hospitalized for smoke inhalation after a fire breaks out at a retirement home in Bucharest.

Sport 
 February 3 – Vatra Dornei hosts the FIL World Luge Championships, with Romania's team placing fourth.

Arts and entertainment 
 May 14–20 – Despite rain, the 14th edition of Bucharest Pride unfolds in Romania's capital. Human rights organisations and 30 embassies endorse the event.
 June 2–11 – The 16th edition of Transilvania International Film Festival takes place in Cluj-Napoca. French actor Alain Delon receives the TIFF Award for his entire career.
 July 1 – Cluj Pride, first pride parade to take place in Transylvania, is attended by 1,000 people.
 August 3–6 – Up to 330,000 people attend the largest edition to date of Untold Festival in Cluj-Napoca. Among artists that performed during the four-day festival are MØ, Charli XCX, Ellie Goulding, Armin van Buuren, Marshmello, Martin Garrix and Steve Aoki.

Deaths

January

 January 12 – Iulian Rădulescu, self-proclaimed "emperor of Roma from everywhere" (b. 1938) 
 January 18 – Ion Besoiu, actor (b. 1931)
 January 22 – 
 Dan Caspi, 71, Romanian-born Israeli media theorist and academic.
 Cristina Adela Foișor, chess player (b. 1967)
 January 24 – Dan Adamescu, businessman (b. 1948)
 January 29 – Stelian Olariu, conductor (b. 1928)

February

 February 1 – 
 Constantin Dinulescu, 85, Romanian footballer (AS Progresul București).
 Alma Redlinger, 92, Romanian painter.
 February 5 – Irma Adelman, 86, Romanian-born American economist.
 February 7 – Valeriu Bularca, 85, Romanian wrestler, Olympic silver medalist (1964).
 February 9 – Radu Gabrea, 79, Romanian film director (Călătoria lui Gruber) and screenwriter.
 February 20 – Sofía Ímber, 92, Romanian-born Venezuelan journalist.

December

 December 5 – 
 Michael I of Romania former king (b. 1921)
 Cristina Nicolau, 40, Romanian Olympic triple jumper (2000), European Athletics U23 champion (1997, 1999).

See also

List of 2017 box office number-one films in Romania 
2017 in the European Union
2017 in Europe
Romania in the Eurovision Song Contest 2017

References

External links

 
2010s in Romania
Years of the 21st century in Romania
Romania
Romania